Marie Therese Forster may refer to:
 Marie Therese Forster (1764-1829), wife of Georg Forster, known as Therese Forster or under her second married name Therese Huber
 Marie Therese Forster (1786-1864), daughter of Georg Forster and his wife Therese, known as Therese Forster